Mackenson "Mack" Bernard  (born March 4, 1976) is a Haitian-born American politician. He lives in Boynton Beach, Florida. Bernard moved to Florida in 1986.

Political career
He was first elected to the Florida House of Representatives in 2009 as a Democrat in the 27th district.

In 2012, Bernard ran for a seat in the 27th district of the Florida Senate, facing fellow Representative Jeff Clemens. Clemens won the endorsement of labor unions AFL-CIO and SEIU, while Bernard received the endorsement of the Florida Chamber of Commerce. In the end, Clemens was able to narrowly defeat Bernard by only seventeen votes in the primary election. Bernard held out hope, however, that Clemens's victory would be overturned and filed a lawsuit to have forty absentee ballots counted. A judge in Tallahassee ruled against Bernard but allowed nine provisional ballots to be counted, which would not have been enough to allow Bernard to emerge victorious. In the general election, Clemens remained on the ballot as the Democratic nominee, and was elected unopposed.

Personal life and career

Bernard holds a Juris Doctor with honors from University of Florida Levin College of Law. He earned a teaching fellowship for legal research and writing.  Bernard was a member of the University of Florida Trial Team that participated in national competitions. After passing the Florida Bar examinations, Bernard earned an Master of Laws in Taxation from the University of Florida in 2003.

References 

1976 births
Living people
21st-century American politicians
American politicians of Haitian descent
Businesspeople from Florida
Democratic Party members of the Florida House of Representatives
Former Presbyterians
Haitian emigrants to the United States
People from Port-au-Prince
University of Florida alumni